David Lim Fong Jock,  (born 8 September 1966) is a retired Singaporean swimmer. He won 28 medals, including ten individual and nine relay gold medals, at the Southeast Asian Games from 1981 to 1991. He was part of the Singapore freestyle relay teams that won three bronze medals at the 1986 and 1990 Asian Games. A two-time Olympian, Lim represented Singapore at the 1984 and 1988 Summer Olympics.

Lim is a three-time Singapore National Olympic Council Sportsman of the Year in 1986, 1988 and 1989, and a member of the Men's Swimming 4 × 100 m Freestyle Team of the Year in 1991. He was honoured with the Public Service Star for his contribution to sports by the Singapore government in 1990.

Lim currently coaches the Singapore national swimmers. He is the managing director of Swimfast Aquatic Group, a swimming school he founded in 1995.

References

External links
 
 
 
 

1966 births
Living people
Singaporean people of Chinese descent
Singaporean male freestyle swimmers
Swimmers at the 1984 Summer Olympics
Swimmers at the 1986 Asian Games
Swimmers at the 1986 Commonwealth Games
Swimmers at the 1988 Summer Olympics
Swimmers at the 1990 Asian Games
Swimmers at the 1990 Commonwealth Games
Commonwealth Games competitors for Singapore
Asian Games medalists in swimming
Olympic swimmers of Singapore
Anglo-Chinese School alumni
Brigham Young University alumni
BYU Cougars men's swimmers
Recipients of the Bintang Bakti Masyarakat
Asian Games bronze medalists for Singapore
Medalists at the 1986 Asian Games
Medalists at the 1990 Asian Games
Southeast Asian Games medalists in swimming
Southeast Asian Games gold medalists for Singapore
Southeast Asian Games silver medalists for Singapore
Southeast Asian Games bronze medalists for Singapore
Competitors at the 1981 Southeast Asian Games
20th-century Singaporean people